The 2022 West Coast Conference baseball tournament will be held from May 25 through 28 at Banner Island Ballpark in Stockton, California.  The six team tournament winner will earn the league's automatic bid to the 2022 NCAA Division I baseball tournament.

Seeding
The top six finishers from the regular season will be seeded one through six based on conference winning percentage.  Teams 1 and 2 will have a bye into the double elimination bracket while 3 plays 6 and 4 plays 5 in a single elimination first round.

Tiebreakers:
Portland went 2–1 vs. San Diego to win the #2 seed and give San Diego the #3.
Loyola Marymount went 2–1 vs. San Francisco to win the #5 seed and give San Francisco the #6.

Results

Play-in round

Double-elimination round

Schedule
In addition to the tv channels listed, all matches will be streamed on WCC Network.

Conference championship

References

West Coast Conference Baseball Championship
Tournament
Baseball competitions in Stockton, California
West Coast Conference baseball tournament
College baseball tournaments in California